The Bunny Museum  is a museum dedicated to rabbits that was opened to the public in 1998, located in a mid-century building in Altadena, California, US. The museum currently holds more than 35,000 rabbit-related items across 16 galleries in a 7,000 square foot space. Amongst the ever-expanding collection there are ceramic rabbits, rabbit antiquities, stuffed rabbits, cookie-jar rabbits, 9 Rose Parade float rabbits, freeze-dried rabbits, and more. The museum has held the world record for "owning the most bunny items in the world" since 1999 when it was acknowledged by Guinness World Records. At that point in time, it housed 8,473 pieces of rabbit memorabilia. The slogan of the museum is "The Hoppiest Place in the World". It also houses three live rabbits.

The museum was co-founded by married couple Candace Frazee and Steve Lubanski, who started collecting the items after they began a tradition of giving each other new rabbit-themed gifts every day. Originally housed in the couple's residential home in Pasadena, the museum relocated to larger premises in Altadena in 2017.

In 2018, the Los Angeles Times wrote of the museum: "The rabbit array may seem to tilt to kitsch, but the vast stockpile harbors insight and imparts a quirky sort of gravitas."

See also
House Rabbit Society

References

External links
 

Leporidae
Altadena, California
Museums in Los Angeles County, California